The women's 200 metres at the 2012 World Junior Championships in Athletics was held at the Estadi Olímpic Lluís Companys on 12 and 13 July.

Medalists

Records

Results

Heats
Qualification: The first 3 of each heat (Q) and the 3 fastest times (q) qualified

Semi-finals
Qualification: The first 2 of each heat (Q) and the 2 fastest times (q) qualified

Final
Wind: +0.2 m/s

Participation
According to an unofficial count, 48 athletes from 36 countries participated in the event.

References

External links
 WJC12 200 metres schedule

200 metres
200 metres at the World Athletics U20 Championships
2012 in women's athletics